Joseph Keith Kellogg Jr. (born May 12, 1944) is a former United States government official and a retired lieutenant general in the United States Army. He previously served as the National Security Advisor to Vice President Mike Pence, and as the Executive Secretary and Chief of Staff of the United States National Security Council in the Trump administration. He served as National Security Advisor on an acting basis following the resignation of Michael T. Flynn.

Life and career

Early life and military service
Kellogg was born in Dayton, Ohio, the son of Helen (Costello) and Joseph Keith Kellogg. In 1961, he received his diploma from Long Beach Polytechnic High School. Kellogg was commissioned into the Army through the Reserve Officers Training Corps (ROTC)  at Santa Clara University as an Infantry Officer. During his time in service, Kellogg earned an M.S. in international affairs from the University of Kansas. Kellogg later went on to study senior level management and diplomacy at the United States Army War College.

During the Vietnam War he served in the 101st Airborne Division and, after qualifying as a U.S. Army Special Forces officer, as a special forces adviser to the Cambodian Army. It was during his time in Vietnam that Kellogg earned the Silver Star, Bronze Star with "V" Device, and Air Medal with "V" Device. Kellogg also commanded 3rd Brigade, 7th Infantry Division during Operation Just Cause.

In 1980, then LTC Kellogg commanded 1st Battalion, 504th Parachute Infantry Regiment and became the first light infantry unit to rotate to the Fort Irwin National Training Center (NTC) located in the Mojave Desert. 

During Operation Desert Shield/Desert Storm, from 1990 to 1991, Kellogg served as the Chief of Staff of the 82nd Airborne Division and then as its Assistant Division Commander.  Kellogg was subsequently selected as the Commander of Special Operations Command Europe (SOCEUR). In 1996, he took command of the 82nd Airborne Division and retired from the Army in 2003, as a lieutenant general after serving as director of command, control, communications and computers for U.S. forces under the Joint Chiefs of Staff.

Kellogg was in the Pentagon during the attacks on September 11, 2001.  Following the crash of American Airlines Flight 77 into the Pentagon, Kellogg assumed responsibility of the alternate command post at Raven Rock Mountain Complex with United States Deputy Secretary of Defense Paul Wolfowitz.

From December 2003 to 2004, following his retirement, he held a leading position in the Coalition Provisional Authority (CPA). Kellogg was asked to serve as Chief Operating Officer for the CPA in Baghdad, the transition government of Iraq, after the 2003 U.S.-led invasion of that country and the signing of Coalition Provisional Authority Order 2 which disbanded the Iraqi Army. During this time, Kellogg, with a reputation as an "expediter" known for cutting through red tape, was tasked with ensuring speed and discipline during the massive reconstruction process.  Following his service with the CPA, Kellogg was awarded the Department of Defense Medal for Distinguished Public Service.

Private sector
Following Kellogg's retirement from active duty, he joined Oracle Corporation as an adviser to its homeland security division. He was employed by Cubic Corporation and earlier by CACI International Inc., since January 2005.

Trump campaign and administration
Kellogg was named a foreign policy advisor to then-presidential candidate Donald Trump in March 2016. Trump put Kellogg in charge of the presidential transition agency action team for defense. On December 15, 2016, it was announced that Kellogg would be appointed Chief of Staff and Executive Secretary of the United States National Security Council by President-elect Donald Trump.

On February 13, 2017, following the resignation of National Security Advisor Michael Flynn, Keith Kellogg became the Acting National Security Advisor in the interim of a permanent replacement being appointed. President Trump interviewed Kellogg and three others to determine who permanently to fill the position of National Security Advisor. The position ultimately went to H. R. McMaster.

In April 2018, Vice President Mike Pence chose Kellogg to serve as his national security advisor. According to the White House, Kellogg would continue to serve as an assistant to Trump.

During the Trump–Ukraine scandal which led to Trump's impeachment (and subsequent acquittal) Kellogg said he "heard nothing wrong or improper" in Trump's call with the Ukrainian president. 

Kellogg spoke at the 2020 Republican National Convention on August 26, 2020.

During the 2021 United States Capitol attack Kellogg defended Pence's decision not to leave the Capitol. While the Secret Service was attempting to get Pence to ride to a safer place, Pence insisted on staying. Kellogg reportedly told Anthony Ornato, former Secret Service and at the time White House Deputy Chief of Staff for Operations, why Pence would not be evacuated, “You can’t do that, Tony. Leave him where he’s at. He’s got a job to do. I know you guys too well. You’ll fly him to Alaska if you have a chance. Don’t do it.” Kellogg made it clear that Pence would stay, even if he needed to remain all night." Kellogg is viewed as a "key witness" in the United States House Select Committee on the January 6 Attack because he was with Trump in the White House as the attack occurred. Kellogg testified under oath to the committee in December 2021, telling them that the president's staff encouraged the president to take immediate action to quell the unrest, but that he refused.

Personal life
Kellogg is the second oldest of four children.  His older brother, Mike Kellogg, is a Los Angeles County Superior Court Judge.  His sister, Kathy, is a former actress who is now a clinical psychologist and his younger brother, Jeff, is a former Long Beach city councilman, served as President of the Long Beach Community College District Board of Trustees, and now currently works for the California Community College system.

Kellogg married his wife, Paige, in 1980.  Paige is a former U.S. Army officer and paratrooper who served during the 1983 U.S. invasion of Grenada. Together, they have three children.

Awards and decorations
Silver Star Citation

Awarded for actions during the Vietnam War

SYNOPSIS: First Lieutenant (Infantry) Joseph Keith Kellogg, United States Army, was awarded the Silver Star for gallantry in action while serving with the 101st Airborne Division during Operation EAGLE THRUST in the Republic of Vietnam. During an air assault, Lieutenant Kellogg pulled a wounded man from a fire line, then went on to attack an enemy bunker system with a machine gun. Running down the line, he destroyed five enemy bunkers with hand grenades. His gallant actions and dedicated devotion to duty, without regard for his own life, were in keeping with the highest traditions of military service and reflect great credit upon himself, his unit, and the United States Army.

Action Date: Vietnam War
Service: Army
Division: 101st Airborne Division

Kellogg's major decorations and badges include:

See also
Timeline of investigations into Trump and Russia (2019)

References

External links

1944 births
Living people
Military personnel from Dayton, Ohio
Recipients of the Defense Superior Service Medal
Recipients of the Distinguished Service Medal (US Army)
Recipients of the Legion of Merit
Recipients of the Silver Star
Santa Clara University alumni
Trump administration personnel
United States Army generals
United States National Security Advisors
University of Kansas alumni
United States Army personnel of the Vietnam War
Long Beach Polytechnic High School alumni